Fenor GAA is a Gaelic Athletic Association club based in the small east Waterford, Ireland village of Fenor. The club enters teams in both Gaelic football and hurling each year, both of which compete in their respective junior championships.

Fenor's greatest achievement was winning the Waterford Senior Football Championship in 1932. Fenor also collected countless junior hurling titles in 1990s and 2000s (decade) but they never gained promotion to intermediate status.

Fenor4Junior is Fenor GAA's version of "The American Dream". It was set up in 2010 to instill the belief that Fenor could go all the way in the Waterford Junior Hurling Championship for the first time in the club's history. However, a number of poor performances that year caused the dream to be shattered. In 2011, a large number of injuries, along with exams and retirements, meant Fenor made no impact on the championship. The belief has spread to many places near and far; Tramore CBS have numerous 'Fenor4Junior' Tipp-Ex markings in many classrooms and on many chairs. The common phrase can also be heard by a number of tourists in Fenor's hinterland during the summer months.

Honours
Waterford Senior Football Championships: 1
 1932
Waterford Junior Hurling Championships: 1
 2015
 Munster Junior Club Hurling Championships0
 Runners-Up 2015
 Waterford Junior Football Championships: 
 1928, 1979
 Waterford Minor Hurling Championships: 0
 Runner-Up 2009 (with Dunhill)

Notable players
 Stevie Burns Jr
 David Beehan
 Paddy Cowman
 Jim Halley
 Greg O'Neill
 David Burns

References

External links
Fenor GAA official website - former website but no longer active

Gaelic games clubs in County Waterford
Hurling clubs in County Waterford
Gaelic football clubs in County Waterford